is the third installment in the Samurai Warriors series, created by Tecmo Koei and Omega Force. The game was released in Japan on December 3, 2009, in Europe on May 28, 2010, in Australia on June 10, 2010, and in North America on September 28, 2010, for the Wii.

Shigeru Miyamoto from Nintendo attended the game's Press Conference on August 5, 2009, to present a new mode in the game based on the Famicom Disk System game The Mysterious Murasame Castle. Nintendo published and distributed the game outside Japan for the Wii.

A sequel, Samurai Warriors 4, was announced at a SCEJ press conference in September 2013.

Story
Like other games in the series, the game reinvents the story based on the Sengoku period of Japan, a period where Japan was ruled by powerful daimyōs and where constant military conflict and much political intrigue happened that lasted from the middle of 16th century to the beginning of 17th century. However, the game has a slightly extended time frame compared to the previous game; while Samurai Warriors 2 is mostly focused on the events leading to the great battle of Sekigahara, this game also covers the events beforehand.

Gameplay
The game features many gameplay improvements over previous games in the series, the most notable being the addition of the Spirit Gauge, a gauge which allows for characters to cancel certain attacks to perform more powerful ones. These occur depending on the level of the gauge. It can also be combined with Musou attacks to perform an "True Musou". Certain combinations of attacks from the Xtreme Legends expansions also make a comeback. Each of the character's weapons are categorized under Normal, Speed, and Power types similar to Dynasty Warriors 6, except that each character still has unique weapons assigned to them.

The option to create/edit characters from the original game returns and is required to access the new "Historical Mode", which can be used to create an original story for edit characters by reenacting parts of historical battles. Both Story Mode and Free Mode return, as does the shop system, which has been redesigned and is now part of "Dojo", a section also dedicated to creating edit characters and color-edit existing characters. An exclusive mode for the Wii version is the "Murasame Castle" based on the Nintendo game Nazo no Murasame Jō, which allows for the control of its lead character Takamaru.

Characters
Seven new characters made their playable debut in the Samurai Warriors franchise, most of them former generic non-player characters in past installments. Most of the characters from previous games also return, all redesigned with several receiving new weapons. Four characters; Goemon Ishikawa, Gracia, Musashi Miyamoto, and Kojiro Sasaki do not return, although Gracia later returns in the Moushouden expansion. Of all of them, seven characters do not have stories, though they are given stories in the Moushouden expansion. Altogether, there are 30 returning characters for a total of 37 characters in the game.

* Denotes characters added through expansion titles
** Denotes Takamaru only found in Samurai Warriors 3/Sengoku Musou 3: Moushouden
Bold denotes default charactersBundles
The game comes in three different variations; a stand-alone copy of the game, a Classic Controller Pro set, and a treasure box edition. The treasure box edition includes the controller as well as a mini figure, an original soundtrack CD and a book with strategies and artwork. The controller included in the latter two bundles is a special edition black Classic Controller Pro with the game's logo and Japanese inkbrush marks in gold.

Music
At the game's press conference on August 5, it was revealed that JPop artist Gackt would be performing two theme songs for the game, "Zan" and "Setsugekka". The song "Zan" was used in the promotional commercials for the game, and is also featured in the game's ending. The single, titled "Setsugekka (The End of Silence)/Zan", which contains both songs, was released on December 9, 2009.

Expansions
The game features three expansions/ports that either add new contents or expand on gameplay mechanics of the game.

Sengoku Musou 3: Moushouden/ZSengoku Musou 3: Moushouden is the first expansion of the game, released for the Wii in Japan on February 10, 2011. The game introduces two new modes, the "Original Career" mode which allows the opportunity to create original scenarios by completing missions and acquiring gold to increase the player's abilities and strength, as well as the series staple "Challenge" mode that has three challenges of varying objectives. It also adds new weapons, items, two new difficulty levels ("Novice" and "Expert") and stories for characters that did not have them in the original. The game also has online functionality which was not possible in the original. It was also released for the PlayStation 3 on the same day under the title of Sengoku Musou 3 Z. This version has updated graphics compared to the Wii, but removes the Murasame Castle mode and Takamaru. Both of these versions have yet to receive an overseas release.

Sengoku Musou 3: EmpiresSengoku Musou 3: Empires is the second expansion of the game, released for the PlayStation 3 in Japan on August 25, 2011. Like the other Empires expansion, the game is more focused on the political and tactical battle system. The game features a different version of Historical Mode and Free Mode that fits with the Empires structure and retains the edit character feature. Like Moushouden, this game has yet to be released overseas.

Sengoku Musou 3 Z: SpecialSengoku Musou 3 Z: Special' is a port for the PlayStation Portable released in Japan on February 16, 2012. As it is based on Sengoku Musou 3 Z, it has all of its features (including the removal of Murasame Castle mode and Takamaru) as well as the ability for four players to compete in the game's Challenge mode. Due to memory limitations however, the graphics have been significantly downgraded. It has yet to receive an overseas release.

ReceptionSamurai Warriors 3'' was met with very mixed to negative reception upon release; GameRankings gave it a score of 59%, while Metacritic gave it 55 out of 100.

See also
List of Samurai Warriors characters

References

External links
Official North American website
Official European website
Official Japanese website
Japanese Site of 3Z

2009 video games
PlayStation 3 games
Nintendo games
Koei games
PlayStation Portable games
Video games about samurai
Samurai Warriors
Wii games
Multiplayer and single-player video games
Crowd-combat fighting games
Video games developed in Japan
Video games set in feudal Japan